Ballast was a Canadian website about current events and culture.  The site was founded in 2012 by Paul Hiebert and Jonathan Hall. Ballast contributors include writers for The Globe and Mail, The Awl, The Walrus, The CBC, Maclean's, The New York Times, and others. The site is considered to be the first Canadian site of its kind, modelling itself after American websites such as The Awl, Gawker, and The Dish. In 2016, former Ballast writer Andrew Unger started The Daily Bonnet.

References

External links

Canadian news websites
Internet properties established in 2012
2012 establishments in Canada